Despite Straight Lines is the only studio album by British singer-songwriter Marilyn, released in 1985.

Overview
Although Marilyn had scored three top 40 hits throughout the 1983–84 period, his debut album was not released until mid-1985, 18 months after his biggest hit "Calling Your Name" was a top 10 hit. Possibly due to a loss of momentum, the album only charted in Australia, and subsequent singles taken from it were also unsuccessful.

The album was reissued on CD in 2008 as Despite Straight Lines: The Very Best of Marilyn, by Cherry Pop (a division of Cherry Red Records). The reissue includes several bonus tracks, consisting of B-sides and alternative versions, though it excludes the single "Pray for That Sunshine".

Track listing
 "Calling Your Name" (Marilyn, Paul Caplin) – 4:06
 "Mountain to the Ocean" (Roger Jackson) – 3:46
 "Surrender to Your Love" (Marilyn) – 4:04
 "Pray for That Sunshine" (Marilyn) – 4:00
 "Third Eye" (Marilyn) – 3:24
 "Baby U Left Me (In the Cold)" (Marilyn) – 3:51
 "You Don't Love Me" (Marilyn) – 3:24
 "Give It Up" (Eric Robinson) – 3:58
 "Wear It Out" (Marilyn, Eric Robinson) –2:17
 "Cry and Be Free" (Marilyn) – 3:34

CD re-issue (bonus tracks) 
 "Calling Your Name" (Midnight Party Mix) (Marilyn, Paul Caplin) – 4:42
 "Move Together" (Marilyn) – 3:36
 "Calling Your Name" (Extended Version) (Marilyn, Paul Caplin) – 6:54
 "Running" (Marilyn) – 3:06
 "Cry and Be Free" (Gospel) (Marilyn) – 5:43
 "Cry and Be Free" (Streisand Style) (Marilyn) – 5:19
 "Raining Again" (Dub Version) (Marilyn) – 7:08
 "Baby U Left Me (In the Cold)" (Extended Version) (Marilyn) – 7:08

Personnel
Producers
 Alan Winstanley (tracks 1, 3, 6, 9, 10, 12, 14, 15)
 Clive Langer (tracks 1, 3, 6, 9, 10, 12, 14, 15)
 Don Was (tracks 2, 5, 17)
 Eric Robinson (tracks 4, 7, 8)
 Roger Jackson (tracks 11, 13, 16)
Julian Mendelsohn - mixing (tracks 8, 9)
Clare Muller - photography
Bobby Rae, Carol "Sugar Lips" Hall, Claudia Fontaine, Eric Robinson, Sweet Pea "Python" Atkinson - backing vocals

Charts

References

1985 debut albums
Albums produced by Alan Winstanley
Albums produced by Clive Langer
Albums produced by Don Was
Mercury Records albums
Marilyn (singer) albums
New wave albums by English artists